The Kensington Dollshouse Festival, formerly the London Dollshouse Festival, is a biannual festival held at Kensington Town Hall in London for the showcase of dollhouse miniatures, founded in 1985 by Caroline Hamilton. It is considered one of the most important dolls' house festivals in Europe. It has both a summer show and a Christmas show.

During the COVID-19 pandemic, the event was held as an "Online Showcase" in which each craftsperson had their page on a website instead of being in-person.

See also
 List of festivals in the United Kingdom

References

External links 
 The official site for London Dollshouse Showcase

Cultural festivals in the United Kingdom
Dollhouses